Vadim Abdullayev (born on 17 December 1994) is an Azerbaijani football midfielder who plays for Araz-Naxçıvan in the Azerbaijan First Division.

Club career
On 5 May 2012, Abdullayev made his debut in the Azerbaijan Premier League for Baku match against Neftçi Baku.

Honours
Baku
Azerbaijan Cup (1): 2011–12

References

External links
 

1994 births
Living people
Association football midfielders
Azerbaijani footballers
Azerbaijan youth international footballers
Azerbaijan under-21 international footballers
Azerbaijan Premier League players
FC Baku players
Simurq PIK players
Gabala FC players
Sumgayit FK players
Sabah FC (Azerbaijan) players